Ambaji Venkatesh Shinde (22 December 1917 – 8 April 2003) was a prominent jewelry designer in New York. 

The book "Harry Winston The Ultimate Jeweler" published in 1984 acknowledges Ambaji Venkatesh Shinde as "one of the most talented designers in the world today." A number of his jewelry designs appear in this book.

Early life
A.V.Shinde was born in 1917 in Mapusa, Goa, a Portuguese colony in India, in a Bombay Presidency-origin family that had immigrated illegally to Goa from British India. He was drawn towards decorative arts at an early age painting backdrops and costume jewelry for the local Hindu temple religious functions.

Career
Shinde came to Mumbai in 1934 to attend the J. J. School of Art. In his talk with Dona Dirlam of the Gemological Institute of America (GIA) he said that the formal study in textile design influenced his later work. He had to seek work when his father died in 1937. His first job was at Narottamdas Jhaveri where he designed ornate silverware, trophies and jewelry. He was hired by Nanubhai Jhaveri in 1941 where he worked for nearly 20 years designing jewelry for the Maharajas.

He followed the rich Indian tradition in his designs. He had a small picture of the Flying Apsara from Ajanta cave number 17 in his office. The design criteria changed when the Maharajas started to go abroad and desired western style jewelry.

Harry Winston met him in 1955 and recognized a kindred soul and eventually hired him in 1962. He soon developed a gemstone driven style transforming fine jewelry into fine art. Harry Winston invented flexible, three-dimensional, near invisible mountings which freed the stones from heavy metal surrounds.

After four decades of working in New York City, Shinde retired in December 2001 but continued to paint from home. He donated a number of designs to the GIA for a permanent display. Thousands of his designs remain in the Harry Winston archives and "provides a creative spark to ignite new interpretations of Harry Winston jewels for the next generations".

Personal life
Shinde married Anu in 1940. They had six sons and 10 grandchildren. He had a large circle of close friends, loved Indian classical music and spicy food.

He died on 8 April 2003 of pneumonia which he contracted in a Manhattan hospital.

A Shinde painting of a necklace illustrates his mastery of the art of jewelry designing.

References

Obituaries and other Links

Karen Robinovitz, The Man Who Romanced the Stones, New York  Times, 23 December 2001. (https://www.nytimes.com/2001/12/23/style/the-man-who-romanced-the-stones.html)

Guy Trebay, Ambaji Shinde, 85, Designer of Jewelry for the Wealthy, New York Times, 11 April 2003. (https://www.nytimes.com/2003/04/11/arts/ambaji-shinde-85-designer-of-jewelry-for-the-wealthy.html)

Suzy Menkes, Bowing Out: A Jeweler to The Maharajas, New York Times, 18 December 2001.
(https://www.nytimes.com/2001/12/18/style/18iht-fjewel_ed3_.html)

Guy Trebay, Ambaji Shinde, Jewelry Designer, Dies at 85, New York Times, 11 April 2003.
(https://www.nytimes.com/2003/04/11/obituaries/11SHIN.html)

Joyce Wadler, Public Lives; A Humble Creator of High-Profile Jewelry, New York Times, 24 December 1998.
(https://www.nytimes.com/1998/12/24/nyregion/public-lives-a-humble-creator-of-high-profile-jewelry.html)

Aseem Chhabra, Gem of an Indian, India Abroad, 25 April 2003.

Aseem Chhabra, The Hidden Gem, India Abroad, 4 March 2005.

1917 births
2003 deaths
People from Mapusa
Indian jewellery designers
Businesspeople from Goa
20th-century Indian designers
Artists from Goa
Indian emigrants to the United States